Dendropoma anguliferum is a species of sea snail, a marine gastropod mollusk in the family Vermetidae, the worm snails or worm shells.

Distribution
This snail is found in the Mediterranean Sea.

References

External links

Vermetidae
Gastropods described in 1884